Long Run is a ghost town in Licking County, in the U.S. state of Ohio.

History
Long Run once contained a mill. A post office was established at Long Run in 1858, and remained in operation until 1904.

References

Geography of Licking County, Ohio
1858 establishments in Ohio
Populated places established in 1858
Ghost towns in Ohio